Return of Wax is a studio album by The Upsetters, released in 1975. The album was first released as a very limited white label LP. The titles for the tracks first appeared on the 90's CD issue of the album.

Track listing

Side one
"Last Blood"
"Deathly Hands"
"Kung Fu Warrior"
"Dragon Slayer"
"Judgement Day"

Side two
"One Armed Boxer"
"Big Boss"
"Fists of Vengeance"
"Samurai Swordsman"
"Final Weapon"

References

The Upsetters albums
1975 albums
Albums produced by Lee "Scratch" Perry